Yuduan Township is a rural township in Xiangxiang City, Hunan Province, People's Republic of China.

Cityscape
The township is divided into 35 villages, the following areas: Changlun Village, Huchong Village, Xiaochong Village, Anchong Village, Shi'e Village, Tianping Village, Zhongtian Village, Yangming Village, Shideng Village, Quanlong Village, Yuqiao Village, Yuduan Village, Zhichong Village, Shuiqiao Village, Shantang Village, Renmei Village, Shangshan Village, Shuangqiao Village, Shidong Village, Huaping Village, Junshan Village, Songyue Village, Daqiao Village, Anxiang Village, Zhaqiao Village, Zhaping Village, Zhajiang Village, Nanping Village, Nanchong Village, Nanshan Village, Shuikousi Village, Dongtangpu Village, Dongchong Village, Henglu Village, and Shiquan Village (长仑村、虎冲村、小冲村、安冲村、石鹅村、田坪村、中田村、杨名村、石磴村、泉龙村、育桥村、育段村、直冲村、水桥村、山塘村、仁美村、上山村、双桥村、石洞村、花坪村、军山村、松岳村、大桥村、安乡村、轧乔村、轧坪村、轧江村、南坪村、南冲村、南山村、水口斯村、东塘铺村、东冲村、横路村、石泉村).

References

External links

Divisions of Xiangxiang